Alf Fields BEM (15 November 1918 – 14 November 2011) was an English professional footballer who played as a centre half.

Career
Fields signed with Arsenal in 1936, turned professional in 1937, and made his debut in 1939. Between then and 1952, Fields made a total of 19 appearances in the Football League. Arsenal won the old First Division in 1947–48, but he only made six league appearances all season. After retiring as a player, Fields spent time as a coach at Arsenal, before eventually retiring in November 1983.

Fields played himself in the 1939 film The Arsenal Stadium Mystery.

During World War II, Fields served in North Africa and Italy, earning the British Empire Medal.

As the time of his death, Fields was Arsenal's oldest surviving player. He died on 14 November 2011, one day before his 93rd birthday.

References

1918 births
2011 deaths
Footballers from Canning Town
English footballers
Margate F.C. players
Arsenal F.C. players
English Football League players
British Army personnel of World War II
Recipients of the British Empire Medal
Association football central defenders